The Galleria Dallas is a shopping mall and mixed-use development located at the intersection of Interstate 635 and the Dallas North Tollway in the North Dallas neighborhood of Dallas, Texas, United States. It was originally developed by Hines Interests Limited Partnership in 1982. It was modeled after a similar Hines development, the Houston Galleria, which opened in 1970. Both malls have ice rinks and a glass vaulted ceiling that is modeled after the historic Galleria Vittorio Emanuele II in Milan, Italy. It features Banana Republic, The Westin Galleria, Macy's, Pottery Barn, Nordstrom, American Girl, Gap, and Old Navy among its tenants.

The cost of constructing Galleria Dallas was at least $400 million ($1.16 billion, adjusted) when opened in 1982, ranking it as one of the most expensive construction projects for that year, following Walt Disney World's Epcot Center.

There are over 200 stores and restaurants, including an ice rink and the Westin Galleria Hotel. The property is owned by an investment consortium advised by UBS Realty Investors LLC, a subsidiary of UBS AG of Zurich, Switzerland, and is managed by Trademark Property Co.

History
In 1982, the mall, originally named Dallas Galleria, opened, with anchor tenants Marshall Field's and Saks Fifth Avenue as well as the 432-room Westin. By 1985, the mall was expanded and a Macy's location was opened. On September 7, 1985, the mall was the location of WFAA-TV Channel 8's Sump'n Else bandstand program's 20th Anniversary live reunion special hosted by Ron Chapman and Ralph Baker Jr. with special appearances by "The Little Group" dancers and Kenny and the Kasuals, and was also simulcast live on KVIL.
 
In November 1995, the mall underwent a  expansion. In March 1996, Nordstrom opened as the anchor tenant of its new wing. In 1997, Marshall Field's sold all of its Texas locations, including the location at the mall. Saks Fifth Avenue purchased, renovated, and relocated its store to a new space in 1999, while the original location at the mall was later converted into a Gap Inc. megastore housing Banana Republic on the first level, Gap on the second level, and Old Navy on the third level. In 2002, Hines Interests sold the mall to UBS Realty Investors LLC of Hartford, Connecticut, for $300 million. By 2003, a major renovation began and the mall's name was changed to "Galleria Dallas."

In April 2005, UBS Realty Investors LLC acquired the Westin Galleria Hotel, which is attached to the mall, from Hines Interests for $95 million.

In April 2009, General Growth Properties, the management company of the mall, declared bankruptcy. In June, Simon Property Group obtained management rights effective August 1.

In August 2011, a man committed suicide by jumping from the third floor of the mall and landing on the ice rink.

On March 22, 2012, H&M opened on the second floor across from Saks Fifth Avenue.

On June 15, 2013, Saks Incorporated officially closed its Saks Fifth Avenue store in Dallas, which was soon renovated and replaced in 2014 by Belk.

In April 2018, the AC Hotel and Residence Inn Dallas opened near the mall.

In May 2018, Trademark Property Co. was hired to manage, lease, and replan the mall.

On January 23, 2020, it was announced that Belk would be closing on March 21, 2020.

On June 16, 2020 there was a shooting at the mall, where one person was injured. At this time the suspect is at large.

Gallery

See also
 List of shopping malls in Dallas, Texas

References

External links
 

1982 establishments in Texas
Buildings and structures in Dallas
Economy of Dallas
Shopping malls established in 1982
Shopping malls in the Dallas–Fort Worth metroplex